The Bristol Type 172 was a 1940s proposed British long range four-engined bomber project. Although work was carried out on designing experimental half-scale variants, none were built and the project was abandoned.

Design and development 
In October 1946 the Bristol Aeroplane Company tendered a design to the British Air Ministry for a high-speed long-range bomber with four turbojet engines. Designated Type 172, it was liked by Air Staff, who asked the company to build a smaller half-scale Rolls-Royce Nene-powered single-seat aircraft, the Type 174, to the same geometric design with a 45 degree wing sweep.

On 23 July 1947, the Air Ministry issued Specification E.8/47 ("Prototype Flying Models to Operational Requirement 250") to Bristol, who designated it the Type 174. After investigation it was found that the high subsonic flow around the wing-body junction would not work, the wing leading edge would need to be swept. In November 1947 work on the Type 174 was stopped and the E.8/47 specification was revised. The revised specification was issued on 8 June 1948 and required a smaller 3/10th scale aircraft powered by a Rolls-Royce Avon engine. Work on the revised design, the Type 176, was started in February 1948. At a subsequent mock-up conference the company felt it could not support further work on the Type 176 as the company needed to concentrate on the Bristol Britannia turboprop airliner.

Variants
Bristol Type 172
Proposal for a four-engined long-range bomber, not built.
Bristol Type 174
Half-scale variant of the Type 172 for design evaluation powered by a Nene engine, not built.
Bristol Type 176
Revised 3/10th Scale development aircraft for the Type 172 powered by a Avon engine, mock-up only, not built.

Specification (Type 172 as proposed)

References 
Notes

Bibliography 

 C.H. Barnes Bristol Aircraft since 1919, 1988, Putnam, London. 
 Kev Darling. Avro Vulcan, part 1. Lulu.com, 2007. .
 K.J. Meekcom & E.B. Morgan. The British Aircraft Specifications File, 1994, Air-Britain,Tonbridge, Kent.

External links 

 Bristol Aero Engines Olympus

172
Abandoned military projects of the United Kingdom